The 1977 NCAA Division I men's ice hockey tournament was the culmination of the 1976–77 NCAA Division I men's ice hockey season, the 30th such tournament in NCAA history. It was held between March 20 and 26, 1977, and concluded with Wisconsin defeating Michigan 6–5 in overtime. The first-round game were held at the home team venue while all succeeding games were played at the Olympia Stadium in Detroit, Michigan.

For the first time the tournament was expanded beyond 4 teams. The NCAA selection committee granted themselves the ability to add an additional 4 teams to the tournament beyond the two tournament finalists from both the ECAC and WCHA.

Qualifying teams
The NCAA gave four teams automatic bids into the tournament. The two ECAC teams that reached the ECAC tournament final received bids as did the two WCHA teams that reached their tournament championship. The NCAA also had the ability to add up to 4 additional teams as it saw fit and chose to include the CCHA tournament champion as well.

Format
The four automatic qualifiers were seeded according to pre-tournament finish. The ECAC champion was seeded as the top eastern team while the WCHA champion was given the top western seed. The second eastern seed was slotted to play the top western seed and vice versa. Because an at-large bid was offered to a western school they were placed in a first-round game with the second western seed to determine the final semifinalist. The first-round game was played at the home venue of the second seed while all succeeding games were played at the Olympia in Detroit, Michigan. All matches were Single-game eliminations with the semifinal winners advancing to the national championship game and the losers playing in a consolation game.

Tournament bracket

Note: * denotes overtime period(s)

First round

(W2) Michigan vs. (A) Bowling Green

Semifinal

(E1) Boston University vs. (W2) Michigan

(W1) Wisconsin vs. (E2) New Hampshire

Third-place game

(E1) Boston University vs. (E2) New Hampshire

National Championship

(W1) Wisconsin vs. (W2) Michigan

All-Tournament team
G: Julian Baretta* (Wisconsin)
D: Craig Norwich (Wisconsin)
D: John Taft (Wisconsin)
F: Dave Debol (Michigan)
F: Rick Meagher (Boston University)
F: Dave Silk (Boston University)
* Most Outstanding Player(s)

References

Tournament
NCAA Division I men's ice hockey tournament
NCAA Division I Men's Ice Hockey Tournament
NCAA Division I Men's Ice Hockey Tournament
NCAA Division I Men's Ice Hockey Tournament
Ice hockey competitions in Detroit
Sports in Ann Arbor, Michigan